Senator Gilbert may refer to:

Abijah Gilbert (1806–1881), U.S. Senator from Florida
George G. Gilbert (1849–1909), Kentucky State Senate
Jacob H. Gilbert (1920–1981), New York State Senate
Jesse C. Gilbert (1831–1894), Kentucky State Senate
John I. Gilbert (1837–1904), New York State Senate
Judson Gilbert II (born 1952), Michigan State Senate
Newton W. Gilbert (1862–1939), Indiana State Senate
Philip H. Gilbert (1870–1932), Louisiana State Senate
Ralph Waldo Emerson Gilbert (1882–1939), Kentucky State Senate